Burrell Township may mean:

 Burrell Township, Armstrong County, Pennsylvania
 Burrell Township, Indiana County, Pennsylvania

See also 
 Burrell, Pennsylvania (disambiguation)
 Upper Burrell Township, Westmoreland County, Pennsylvania

Pennsylvania township disambiguation pages